Wallichii, a specific epithet honouring Danish botanist Nathaniel Wallich, may refer to:

Plants

Allium wallichii, commonly known as Jimbur or Himalaya onion
Apostasia wallichii, a species of orchid
Bulbophyllum wallichii, a species of orchid
Castanopsis wallichii, a species of plant in the family Fagaceae
Dioscorea wallichii, a climber in the  family Dioscoreaceae
Diospyros wallichii, a tree in the  family Ebenaceae
Dombeya wallichii, commonly known as pinkball, pink ball tree, or tropical hydrangea
Horsfieldia wallichii, a species of plant in the family Myristicaceae
Ligusticum wallichii, a flowering plant in the carrot family known for its use in traditional Chinese medicine
Memecylon wallichii, a species of plant in the family Melastomataceae
Rhododendron wallichii, a rhododendron species
Schima wallichii, an Asian species of evergreen trees belonging to the tea family, Theaceae
Sorbus wallichii, a species of plant in the family Rosaceae
Strobilanthes wallichii, commonly known as Kashmir acanthus, hardy Persian shield, wild petunia, or kandali
Valeriana wallichii, an herb of the family Valerianaceae, also called Indian valerian or tagar-ganthoda
Widdringtonia wallichii, commonly known as Clanwilliam cedar or Clanwilliam cypress

Animals

Brahmaea wallichii,  a moth in the family Brahmaeidae
Catreus wallichii, commonly known as the cheer pheasant or Wallich's pheasant
Thysia wallichii, a beetle in the family Cerambycidae